The Big Dish is a parabolic dish concentrator developed by the Australian National University's Solar Thermal Group.  
The initial prototype, SG3
, was constructed on the Canberra campus of the Australian National University in 1994.  A modified version of SG3 was exported to Ben-Gurion National Solar Energy Center at the Ben Gurion University in Israel.   In 2006, a joint project led by the Solar Thermal Group with commercial partner Wizard Power, and funding from Australian's Government's Renewable Energy Development Initiative,
 
began the design and construction of SG4
.  SG4 is located next to the SG3 dish, and was completed in 2009.

Wizard Power holds the patent rights for the SG4 Big Dish structure and is developing commercial installations which will see arrays of hundreds of dishes delivering tens to hundreds of megawatts of power.  The first of these will be the Whyalla Solar Oasis which will use 300 Big Dishes to deliver a 40MWe solar thermal power plant.  Construction is expected to commence in late 2013.

See also

 Australian National University
 Solar thermal collector
 Concentrating solar power (CSP)
 Solar tracker
 SolarPACES
 Wizard Power

References

External links 
 ANU Big Dish solar
 Research Institute for Sustainable Energy
 Wizard Power company website

Solar thermal energy
Energy conversion
Solar energy in Australia